ACE (advanced cryptographic engine) is the collection of units, implementing both a public key encryption scheme and a digital signature scheme. Corresponding names for these schemes — «ACE Encrypt» and «ACE Sign». Schemes are based on Cramer-Shoup public key encryption scheme and Cramer-Shoup signature scheme. Introduced variants of these schemes are intended to achieve a good balance between performance and security of the whole encryption system.

Authors 
All the algorithms, implemented in ACE are based on algorithms developed by Victor Shoup and Ronald Cramer. The full algorithms specification is written by Victor Shoup. Implementation of algorithms is done by Thomas Schweinberger and Mehdi Nassehi, its supporting and maintaining is done by Victor Shoup. Thomas Schweinberger participated in construction of ACE specification document and also wrote a user manual.

Ronald Cramer currently stays in the university of Aarhus, Denmark. He worked on the project of  ACE Encrypt while his staying in ETH in Zürich, Switzerland.

Mehdi Nassehi and Thomas Schweinberger worked on ACE project in the IBM research lab in Zürich, Switzerland.
Victor Shoup works in the IBM research lab in Zürich, Switzerland.

Security 
The encryption scheme in ACE can be proven secure under reasonable and natural
intractability assumptions.
These four assumptions are:
 The Decisional Diffie-Hellman (DDH) assumption
 Strong RSA assumption
 SHA-1 second preimage collision resistance
 MARS sum/counter mode pseudo-randomness

Basic Terminology and Notation 
Here we introduce some notations, being used in this article.

Basic mathematical notation 
 — The set of integers.
 — The set of univariate polynomials with coefficients in the finite field  of cardinality 2.

Basic string notation 
 — The set of all strings.
 — The set of all strings with length n.
For  — length of string . The string of length zero is denoted .

Bits, Bytes, Words 
 — The set of bits. Let us take all sets of form . For such a set A we define the "zero element":

Conversion operator 
Conversion operator  makes a conversion between elements .

Encryption Scheme

Encryption Key Pair 
The encryption scheme employs two key types:
ACE public key: .
ACE private key: .
For a given size parameter , such that , key components are defined as:
 — a 256-bit prime number.
 — a m-bit prime number, such that .
 — elements  (whose multiplicative order modulo  divides ).
 — elements .

Key Generation 
Algorithm. Key Generation for ACE encryption scheme.
Input: a size parameter , such that .
Output: a public/private key pair.
 Generate a random prime , such that .
 Generate a random integer , such that .
 Generate random integers  and 
 Compute the following integers in :
 Return the public key/private key pair

Ciphertext Representation 
A ciphertext of the ACE encryption scheme has the form

where the components are defined as:
 — element .
 — element .
 we call the preamble, and  — the cryptogram.
We need to introduce the function , which maps a ciphertext to its byte-string
representation, and the corresponding inverse function . For the integer , word string , integers , and byte string , 
For integer , byte string , such that ,

Encryption Process 
Algorithm. ACE asymmetric encryption operation.
input: public key  and byte string .
 Generate  at random.
 Generate the ciphertext preamble:
 Generate  at random.
 Compute , .
 Compute ; note that .
 Compute .
 Compute the key for the symmetric encryption operation:
 , .
 Compute .
 Compute cryptogram .
 Encode the ciphertext: 
 Return .
Before starting off the symmetric encryption process, the input message  is divided into blocks , where each of the block, possibly except the last one, is of 1024 bytes. Each block is encrypted by the stream cipher. For each encrypted block  16-byte message authentication code is computed. We get the cryptogram  Note that if , then .
Algorithm. ACE asymmetric encryption process.
Input:  
Output: , .
 If , then return .
 Initialize a pseudo-random generator state:
 Generate the key : 
 .
 While , do the following:
 .
 Generate mask values for the encryption and MAC:
 .
 .
 Encrypt the plaintext: .
 Generate the message authentication code:
 If , then ; else .
 .
 Update the ciphertext: .
 .
 Return .

Decryption process 
Algorithm. ACE decryption process.
Input: public key  and corresponding private key , byt e string .
Output: Decrypted message .
 Decrypt the ciphertext:
 If , then return .
 Compute: note that , where .
 Verify the ciphertext preamble:
 If , then return .
 .
 If , then .
 Compute ; note that .
 If , then .
 If , then return .
 Compute the key for the symmetric decryption operation:
 , .
 Compute .
 Compute ;note that  can return .
 Return .
Algorithm. Decryption operation .
Input:  
Output: Decrypted message .
 If , then return .
 Initialize a pseudo-random generator state: 
 Generate the key : 
 .
 While , do the following:
 .
 If , then return .
 Generate mask values for the encryption and MAC:
 .
 .
 Verify the message authentication code:
 If , then ; else .
 .
 If , then return .
 Update the plaintext: .
 .
 Return .

Signature Scheme 
The signature scheme employs two key types:
ACE Signature public key: .
ACE Signature private key: .
For the given size parameter , such that , key components are defined the following way:
 — -bit prime number with  — is also a prime number.
 — -bit prime number with  — is also a prime number.
 — and has either  or  бит.
 — elements  (quadratic residues modulo ).
 — 161-bit prime number.
 — element 
 — elements .
 — elements .

Key Generation 
Algorithm. Key generation for the ACE public-key signature scheme.
Input: size parameter , such that .
Output: public/private key pair.
 Set .
 Generate random prime number , где .
 Generate random and compute .
 Return public key/private key pair

Signature Representation 
The signature in the ACE signature scheme has the form , where the components are defined the following way:
 — element .
 — integer, such that .
 — elements .
 — element ;note that , where  — message being signed.
We need to introduce the  function, which maps a signature into its byte string representation, and the corresponding inverse function .
For integer , byte string , where ,

Signature Generation Process 
Algorithm. ACE Signature Generation Process.
Input: public key  and corresponding private key  and byte string , .
Output: byte string — digital signature .
 Perform the following steps to hash the input data:
 Generate a hash key  at random, such that .
 Compute .
 Select  at random, and compute .
 Compute .
Repeat this step until .
 Set ; note that .
 Encode the signature: 
 Return

Notes 
In the definition of ACE Encryption process and ACE Signature process some auxiliary function (e.g. UOWHash, ESHash and some other) are being used, definition of which goes beyond this article. More details about it can be found in в.

Implementation, Utilization and Performance 
ACE Encryption scheme is recommended by NESSIE (New European Schemes for Signatures, Integrity and Encryption) as asymmetric encryption scheme. Press-release is dated by February 2003.

Both schemes were implemented in ANSI C, with the use of GNU GMP library. Tests were done on two platforms: Power PC 604 model 43P under AIX system and 266 MHz Pentium under Windows NT system. Result tables:

Literature

External links
 http://www.alphaworks.ibm.com/tech/ace
 http://www.zurich.ibm.com/security/ace/
 NESSIE Portfolio of recommended cryptographic primitives

Cryptographic software